The Silver King Ranch is a historic ranch in Lewis and Clark County, Montana, U.S.. It includes meadows and two creeks: Landers Fork Creek and Indian Meadows Creek. There are also several buildings, including Owen Byrne Residence, a two-story log cabin whose construction was completed in 1914. It has been listed on the National Register of Historic Places since March 10, 1992.

References

Houses completed in 1914
Houses in Lewis and Clark County, Montana
Log cabins in the United States
Ranches on the National Register of Historic Places in Montana
1900 establishments in Montana
Log buildings and structures on the National Register of Historic Places in Montana
Houses on the National Register of Historic Places in Montana